Cape Blanco is a prominent headland on the Pacific Ocean coast of southwestern Oregon in the United States, forming the westernmost point in the state. Cape Blanco extends farther west than any point of land in the contiguous United States (lower 48 states) except portions of the Olympic Peninsula in Washington, including Cape Alava, the true westernmost point. The cape is part of Cape Blanco State Park and is the location of the Cape Blanco Light, first lit in 1870.

The cape may have been named by explorer Martín de Aguilar in 1603 for its appearance, as blanco means "white" in Spanish. In 1775, Juan Francisco de la Bodega y Quadra named the point Cabo Diligensias. It was later renamed Cape Orford by Captain George Vancouver in 1792, but this name fell into disuse and Cape Blanco became the common usage.

Geology
The cape, a relatively level landform with cliffs facing the sea, is about  higher than the ocean. It consists of layers of uplifted marine sediments, ranging in age from 80 million years at the bottom to less than 500,000 years at the top. The uplift is continuing; Cape Blanco is rising by several millimeters each year. Generally, landforms on the north and south end of the Oregon Coast are rising as the ocean floor slides under the continent, while the central part of the coast "seems to be folding down."

Landforms near the cape include beaches, bluffs, and reefs. Visible to the south are Needle Rock, Blanco Reef, and Humbug Mountain. To the north are Gull Rock, Castle Rock, and Blacklock Point.

Geography

The Sixes River empties into the Pacific Ocean along the north side of the cape. A  walk along the Oregon Coast Trail leads south from the park to the mouth of the Elk River.

Climate
Cape Blanco has very mild temperatures year round, with an all-time record high of only . Annual precipitation is high, but there is a distinct drying trend in summer, which gives Cape Blanco a warm-summer Mediterranean climate (Csb) according to the Köppen climate classification system. During winter storms, wind speeds can reach  at the cape. Extreme winds at the cape and over the Blanco Reef make this part of the coast especially dangerous for ships.

Recreation
Activities at the park include hiking, horseback riding, fishing, camping, picnicking, and beachcombing, among others, and visiting the lighthouse, a pioneer cemetery, or the Hughes House, on the National Register of Historic Places.

The property belonged originally to Patrick Hughes, who came to the cape in 1860 in search of gold and who eventually established a  dairy ranch along the lower Sixes River. Restored by the Friends of Cape Blanco, the two-story, eleven-room ranch house was completed in 1898.

Literature
In Jules Verne's early science fiction book The Begum's Millions, a Utopian community named Ville-France is established in 1872 on the South Oregon beach. Verne gives the location of this fictitious community as "eighty kilometres north of Cape Blanco".  Cape Blanco is also noted on a map of Brobdingnag in Gulliver's Travels. It is also mentioned in Chapter 3 of Moby-Dick: "And that harpoon-so like a corkscrew now-was flung in Javan seas, and run away with by a whale, years afterwards slain off the Cape of Blanco."

Gallery

See also
Cape Blanco (disambiguation)
Cape Blanco State Airport
Cape Mendocino
Extreme points of U.S. states
List of Oregon state parks

References

External links
 
 Cape Blanco Heritage Society

Blanco
State parks of Oregon
Oregon Coast
Landforms of Curry County, Oregon
Parks in Curry County, Oregon